Prenatal nutrition addresses nutrient recommendations before and during pregnancy. Nutrition and weight management before and during pregnancy has a profound effect on the development of infants. This is a rather critical time for healthy development since infants rely heavily on maternal stores and nutrient for optimal growth and health outcome later in life.

Prenatal nutrition has a strong influence on birth weight and further development of the infant. There was a study at the National Institution of Health which found that babies born from an obese mother have a higher probability to fail tests of fine motor skills which is the movement of small muscles such as the hands and fingers.

A common saying that a woman "is eating for two" while pregnant implies that a mother should consume twice as much during pregnancy, but is misleading. Although maternal consumption will directly affect both herself and the growing fetus, overeating excessively will compromise the baby's health as the infant will have to work extra hard to become healthy in the future. Compared with the infant, the mother possesses the least biological risk. Therefore, excessive calories, rather than going to the infant, often get stored as fat in the mother. On the other hand, insufficient consumption will result in lower birth weight.

Maintaining a healthy weight during gestation lowers adverse risks on infants such as birth defects, as well as chronic conditions in adulthood such as obesity, diabetes, and cardiovascular disease (CVD). Ideally, the rate of weight gain should be monitored during pregnancy to support the most ideal infant development.

Background

Barker's hypothesis – influences of birth weight on health in later life

The "Barker Hypothesis", or Thrifty phenotype, states that conditions during pregnancy will have long-term effects on adult health. Associated risk of lifelong diseases includes cardiovascular disease, type-2 diabetes, obesity, and hypertension.  Babies born lighter in weight appear to have an increased rate of mortality than babies born at a heavier weight. This does not mean that heavy babies are less of a concern. Death rate would rise as birth weight increases beyond normal birth weight range. Therefore, it is important to maintain a healthy gestational weight gain throughout pregnancy for achieving the optimal infant birth weight.

When this theory was first proposed, it was not well accepted and was met with much skepticism. The main criticism was that confounding variables such as environmental factors could attribute to many of the chronic diseases such that low birth weight alone should not be dictated as an independent risk factor. Subsequent research studies supporting the theory attempted to adjust these environmental factors and in turn, provided more convincing results with minimal confounding variables.

"Barker's Hypothesis" is also known as "Fetal Programming Hypothesis". The word "programming" illustrates the idea that during critical periods in early fetal development, there are persisting changes in the body structure and function that are caused by environmental stimuli. This relates to the concept of developmental plasticity where our genes can express different ranges of physiological or morphological states responding to the environmental conditions during fetal development.

If the mother has an inadequate diet then it signals the baby that the living condition in the long term will be impoverished. Consequently, the baby adapts by changing its body size and metabolism to prepare for harsh conditions of food shortages after birth. Physiological and metabolic processes in the body undergo long-term changes as a result of restricted growth. When the living environment switches from the condition of malnutrition to a society of abundant supply of nutrients, this exposes the baby to a bountiful environment that goes against what its body is designed for and this places the baby at a higher risk of adult diseases later in adulthood. By the same token, if the fetus growing in the womb of a healthy mother is exposed to prolonged famine after birth, the infant would be less adaptive to the harsh environment than low-birth-weight babies.

Pedersen's hypothesis – influences of maternal glucose concentration on fetal growth
In 1952, the Danish physician Jørgen Pedersen of the University of Copenhagen, formulated the hypothesis that maternal hyperglycemia during pregnancy might cause fetal hyperglycemia, thus exposing the fetus to elevated insulin levels. This would result in an increased risk of fetal macrosomia and neonatal hypoglycemia.

The blood glucose concentration in humans is mainly dependent on diet, especially energy-ingestion and the percentage of carbohydrates in the diet. High glucose concentrations in the blood of pregnant women cause an intensified transfer of nutrient to the fetus, increasing fetal growth. Studies could link higher maternal glucose to an increase in infant birth weight as well as different extents of morbidity, among other things the incidence of congenital malformations, supporting the Hypothesis, that even moderately increased blood glucose in the absence of diabetes positively influences growth in the fetus.

Subsequently, alterations of Pedersen's Hypothesis took place: Nutrients other than sugar and their linkage to fetal overgrowth in diabetic pregnancy were taken into account, too, but the crucial role of the fetal hyperinsulinism and monitoring of motherly glucose was nevertheless stressed. Recent studies pointed out that diabetes in the mother could foster even more lasting effects on the child's health than previously thought, even raising the risk of obesity and type 2 diabetes.

Historical cases

Various nutritional conditions, both times of scarcity and of abundance occurred time and again in different societies at different times, and thus in some cases epidemiological studies have exposed a correlation between the nutritional status of pregnant women and the health of their children or even grandchildren.

The Dutch famine

Since small birth weight is associated with an increased risk of chronic diseases in later life, and poor maternal nutrition during gestation contributes to restricted fetal development, maternal malnutrition may be a cause of increased disease susceptibility in adulthood.

The Dutch famine of 1944 or the "Hunger Winter" during World War II serves as an epidemiological study that is used to examine the effects of maternal under-nutrition during different gestational stages. The famine was a period (roughly five to six months) of extreme food shortage in the west of the Netherlands. The famine was imposed on a previously well-nourished population and the official daily ration for the general adult population gradually decreased from 1800 calories in December 1943 to 1400 calories in October 1944 to below 1000 calories in the late November 1944. December 1944 to April 1945 was the peak of the famine where the official daily ration fell abruptly to about 400~800 calories. Even though pregnant and lactating women had extra food during the famine, these extra supplies could no longer be provided peaking the famine. In the early May 1945, the liberation of the Netherlands restored the food supply. The daily ration had increased to more than 2000 calories in June 1945. What is unique about Dutch Famine as an experimental study on the effects of maternal malnutrition is that the population was strictly circumscribed in time and place and the sudden onset and relief of the famine was imposed on a previously well-nourished population.

The Dutch Famine during World War II had a profound effect on the health condition of the general public, especially women who conceived during the period of time. The period of maternal starvation is shown to have limited intrauterine growth and has been identified as one of the most important contributors to coronary heart disease as well as other chronic diseases later in life. These findings agree well with Barker's hypothesis; it supports the theory that maternal under-nutrition leads to a lower birth weight due to restricted intrauterine development and ultimately leads to higher risks of chronic conditions in adult life.

The French paradox

The French paradox regards the seemingly paradoxical fact that people living in France since many generations suffer from a relatively little incidence of heart disease, although the traditional French cuisine is high in saturated fatty acids.

One explanation suggested for the paradox is the potential impact of nutritional enhancements during pregnancy and the first months and years of life that would positively influence the health of following generations: After the defeat in the Franco-German War, a nutrition program for pregnant women and small children with the aim of strengthening future generations of soldiers was introduced by the French Government. This might be one explanation for positive health-outcomes in following generations.

Recommendations for pregnant women

Gestation stages
Gestation is the period of embryo development from conception to birth. Gestation is about 40 weeks in humans and is divided into three trimesters, each spanning 3 months. Gestational stages, on the other hand, are based on physiological fetal development, which include the germinal stage, embryonic stage and fetal stage.

Germinal stage is the stage from fertilization to about 2 weeks. The fertilized egg or the zygote becomes a blastocyst where the outer layer and the inner cell mass differentiate to form placenta and the fetus respectively. Implantation occurs at this stage where the blastocyst becomes buried in the endometrium.

Embryonic stage is approximately from 2 weeks to 8 weeks. It is also in this stage where the blastocyst develops into an embryo, where all major features of humans are present and operational by the end of this stage.

Fetal stage is from 9 weeks to term. During this period of time, the embryo develops rapidly and becomes a fetus. Pregnancy becomes visible at this stage.

Pre-pregnancy weight and gestational weight gain

The pattern and amount of weight gain is closely associated with gestational stages. Additional energy is required during pregnancy due to the expansion of maternal tissues and stored to support fetal development.

In the first trimester (blastogenesis and early embryonic stages), the mother experiences a minimal weight gain (approximately 0.5-2 kilograms), while the embryo weighs only 6 grams. 

In the second trimester and third trimester (late embryonic and fetal stages), the fetus undergoes rapid weight growth and the weight increases to about 3000~4000 grams. It is also in this period that the mother experiences the bulk of her gestational weight gain but the amount of weight gain varies greatly.  The amount of weight gain depends strongly on their pre-pregnant weight.

Generally, a normal weight is strongly recommended for mothers when entering gestation, as it promotes overall health of infants. Maternal body weight is determined by the Body Mass Index (BMI) which is defined as the weight in kilograms divided by the square of the height in meters.
While pregnant, body weight should be managed within the recommended gestational weight gain range as it is shown to have a positive effect on pregnancy outcomes. Gestational weight gain should also be progressive and the recommended weight depends on pre-pregnant body weight.

Since the total weight gain depends on pre-pregnant body weight, it is recommended that underweight women should undergo a larger weight gain for healthy pregnancy outcomes, and overweight or obese women should undergo a smaller weight gain.

Normal weight women

Women having a BMI of 18.5~24.9 are classified as having a normal or healthy body weight. This group has the lowest risk of adverse birth outcomes. Their babies are least likely to either be low-birth weight or high-birth weight. It is advised that women with a normal weight before pregnancy should gain a total of 11.5 kilograms to 16.0 kilograms throughout gestation, which is approximately 0.4 kilogram per week in the second and third trimesters.

In order to maintain a steady weight gain, the mother should engage in mild physical activities. Participating in aerobic activities such as walking and swimming 3 to 4 times a week is usually adequate. Vigorous physical activity is not recommended since an excessive loss of calories is induced which is not sufficient to support fetal development.

A proper diet is also essential to healthy weight gain. The common saying "a woman is eating for two" often leads to mothers thinking that they should eat twice as much. In reality, only a small increase in caloric intake is needed to provide for the fetus; approximately 350 calories more in the second trimester and 450 calories more in the third trimester. Also, healthy choices should be emphasized for these extra calories such as whole grain products, fruits and vegetables as well as low-fat dairy alternatives.

Underweight women
Women are classified as underweight if they have a pre-pregnant BMI of 18.5 or below. Low pre-pregnancy BMI increases the risk of low birth weight infants, but the risk can be balanced by an appropriate gestational weight gain from 12.5 to 18.0 kilograms in total, or about 0.5 kilogram each week in the second and third trimesters.

Underweight women usually have inadequate nutrient stores that are not enough to provide for both herself and the fetus. While exercise and a proper diet are both needed to maintain the recommended weight gain, a balance between the two is very important. As such, underweight mothers should seek individualized advice tailored especially for themselves.

Overweight and obese women
Women with a high pre-pregnancy weight are classified as overweight or obese, defined as having a BMI of 25 or above. Women with BMI between 25 and 29.9 are in the overweight category and should gain between 7.0 and 11.5 kilograms in total, corresponding to approximately 0.28 kilogram each week during the second and third trimesters. Whereas women with BMI of 30 or above are in the obese category and should gain only between 5.0 and 9.0 kilograms overall, which equates to roughly 0.2 kilogram per week in the second and third trimesters.

Diet, exercise or a combination of both has been seen to reduce weight gain in pregnancy by 20% and reduce high blood pressure. Diet with exercise may reduce the risk of caesarean section, having a large baby and having a baby with serious breathing problems. Diet and exercise help pregnant women not gain too much weight during pregnancy when compared with giving the women no help to control weight gain or routine care (usually one session in the pregnancy).

In general, walking is encouraged for mothers classified in this category. Unfortunately, estimated energy requirements for them are not available. As such, they are encouraged to record activity and intake level. This can be done with the help of tools such as My Food Guide Servings Tracker from Health Canada and EATracker that are available online. In extreme cases where the BMI exceeds 35, help from a registered dietitian is recommended.

Summary table
The following table summarizes the recommended rate of weight gain and total weight gain according to pre-pregnancy BMI for singleton pregnancies. The first column categorizes the type of body weight based on the Body Mass Index. The second column summarizes the total recommended weight gain for each type of body weight, and the third column presents the corresponding weekly weight gain during the period when the fetus undergoes rapid growth (during second and third trimesters). In extreme cases, the amount of total and weekly weight gain can vary by a factor of two depending on a woman's pre-pregnant weight. For example, a woman in the obese category is recommended to gain a total of 5~9 kilograms, whereas an underweight woman needs to gain up to 18 kilograms in weight.

.

Recommendations for low and high birth weight

Diagnosis

To have a good estimate of birth weight, ultrasonography or ultrasound during pregnancy and the date of last menstrual period are needed. Measured values from ultrasonography are compared with the growth chart to estimate fetal weight.

Crown-rump length can be used as the best ultrasonographic measurement for correct diagnosis of gestational age during the first trimester. This correlation between crown-rump length and gestational age would be most effectively shown when no growth defects are observed in the first trimester. If growth defects were observed in the first trimester, then the measurement of the date of last menstrual period becomes quite important since the crown-heel length has become less of a reliable indicator of gestational age.

After the 20th week of pregnancy, the mother would need to visit the doctor for the measurement of fundal height, which is the length from the top portion of the uterus to the pubic bone. The length measured in centimeters should correspond to the number of weeks that the mother has been pregnant. If the measured number is higher or lower than 2 centimeters, further tests using ultrasound would be needed to check the results. Another way to estimate fetal size is to look at the mother's weight gain. How much weight the mother gains can be used to indicate fetal size.

Low birth weight

There are two ways to determine small for gestational age (SGA) infants. Many research studies agree that SGA babies are those with birth weight or crown-heel length measured at two standard deviations or more below the mean of the infant's gestational age, based on data consisting of a reference population. Other studies classify SGA babies as those with birth weight values below the 10th percentile of the growth chart for babies of the same gestational age. This indicates that these babies are weighing less than 90% of babies of the same gestational age.

Many factors, including maternal, placental, and fetal factors, contribute to the cause of impaired fetal growth. There are a number of maternal factors, which include age, nutritional status, alcohol use, smoking, and medical conditions. Insufficient uteroplacental perfusion is an example of a placental factor. Chromosomal abnormalities and genetic diseases are examples of fetal factors.
Identification of the causes of SGA for individual cases aids health professionals in finding ways to handle each unique case. Nutritional counseling, education, and consistent monitoring can be helpful to assist women bearing SGA infants.

Complications for the infant include limitations in body growth since the number and size of cells in tissues is smaller. The infant likely did not receive enough oxygen during pregnancy so the oxygen level is low. It is also more difficult to maintain body temperature since there is less blood flow within the small body.

As such, it is necessary to monitor oxygen level to make sure that it doesn't go too low. If the baby can't suck well, then it may be necessary for tube-feed. Since the baby cannot maintain body temperature sufficiently, a temperature-controlled bed would help to keep their bodies from losing heat. There are ways to help prevent SGA babies. Monitoring fetal growth can help identify the problem during pregnancy well before birth. It would be beneficial to seek professional help and counseling.

High birth weight

Research shows that when birth weights of infants are greater than the 90th percentile of the growth chart for babies of the same gestational age, they are considered large for gestational age or LGA. This indicates that these babies are weighing more than 90% of babies of the same gestational age.

Many factors account for LGA babies, including genetics and excessive nutrient supply. It seems that a common factor for LGA babies is whether or not the mother has diabetes when she is pregnant. An indicator for excessive growth, regardless of gestational age, is the appearance of macrosomia. Many complications are observed for LGA babies and their mothers. A longer delivery time may be expected since it is a difficult birth. The infant would likely suffer hypoglycemia (low glucose level in the blood) after birth. The infant would also have difficulty breathing.

There might be a need for early delivery if the baby gets too big and perhaps Caesarean section would be needed. Since the baby is bigger, there's a higher chance of injury when coming out of the mother's body. To increase the blood glucose level in blood, a glucose/water solution can be offered to the infant.

There are ways to help prevent LGA babies. It is necessary to monitor fetal growth and perform pregnancy examinations to determine health status and detect any possibility of unrecognized diabetes. For diabetic mothers, careful management of diabetes during pregnancy period would be helpful in terms of lowering some of the risks of LGA.

Points to consider
The goal of pregnancy is to have a healthy baby. Maintaining healthy and steady weight gain during pregnancy promotes overall health and reduces the incidence of prenatal morbidity and mortality. This, in turn, has a positive effect on the baby's health.

Since conditions during pregnancy will have long-term effects on adult health, "moderation" should be considered for both dietary and physical activity recommendations. Most importantly, the total recommended pregnancy weight gain depends on pre-pregnant body weight, and weight issues should be addressed before pregnancy.

Research

Malnutrition and the placenta 
The placenta may adapt to maternal malnutrition in an effort to support fetal development and protect against adverse nutritional exposures. In pregnant mice, undernutrition and high fat diets have been shown to alter both placental size and structure, including the expression of key transport systems. Placentae from mothers fed a high fat diet appeared to adapt to excessive nutrient supply, while placentae from undernourished mothers were less mature with impaired transport. These placental adaptations could help to explain why offspring from malnourished pregnancies experience altered growth.

Future direction for research
It is reasonable to expect higher weight gain for multiple gestations. Recommendations for women carrying twins are given but more research should be done to precisely determine the total weight gain, as these ranges are wide. Also, the ranges for underweight women carrying twins is unknown. There was not enough information to recommend weight gain cutoffs and guidelines for women carrying three or more babies, women of short stature (<157 centimetres), and pregnant teens. Estimated energy requirements (EER) for overweight/obese women are unavailable so more research is needed to evaluate on that.
There are also important links between nutrition and mental health across pregnancy. For example, a woman experiencing low mood may be more likely to smoke, use alcohol or neglect her diet<ref></r<Lewis, A. J., Galbally, M., Gannon T., Symeonides C., (2014) Early life programming as a target for prevention of child and adolescent mental disorders: intervention and research directions. BMC Medicine: Special issue on Prevention of Mental Disorders. 12:33 </ref>

Practical advice for mothers
The following general tips can be helpful to pregnant women. It would be beneficial to maintain adequate physical activity to meet energy needs from the food consumed. Eating a balanced diet would be optimal for healthy pregnancy results. To prevent problems like dehydration and constipation, it is important to drink enough fluids, especially water, to support blood volume increases during pregnancy. It is recommended to accompany regular meals with a daily prenatal vitamin supplement that has sufficient folic acid and iron content. 
  
If the fetus is predicted to have low birth weight, in addition to the general recommendations, it would be ideal to increase caloric intake, which can be done by having extra Food Guide Servings daily. 
If the fetus is predicted to have high birth weight, smaller and more frequent meals should be consumed to allow better weight management. Moderate sugar intake, such as fruit juices, is also suggested. It is essential to limit food and beverages with high calories and salt content.

See also
 Smoking and pregnancy
 Nutrition and pregnancy
 Fetal Origins Hypothesis
Fetal Programming

References

Health issues in pregnancy
Midwifery